Yegor Nikolayevich Potapov (born 21 September 1993) is a Russian professional footballer who plays for Maktaaral.

References

External links 
 
 

1993 births
Living people
Russian footballers
Association football defenders
Russian expatriate footballers
Expatriate footballers in Estonia
Expatriate footballers in Lithuania
Expatriate footballers in Kyrgyzstan
Expatriate footballers in Belarus
Expatriate footballers in Kazakhstan
FK Klaipėdos Granitas players
FK Minija Kretinga players
FC Dordoi Bishkek players
FC Smolevichi players
FC Slavia Mozyr players
FC Kaisar players
FC Maktaaral players
Meistriliiga players
A Lyga players
Belarusian Premier League players
Russian expatriate sportspeople in Belarus
Russian expatriate sportspeople in Estonia
Russian expatriate sportspeople in Lithuania
Russian expatriate sportspeople in Kazakhstan
Russian expatriate sportspeople in Kyrgyzstan